The Ethiopian News Agency ( Ye-Ityopya Zéna Agelgelot (IZA) or ENA) is the official news agency of the government of Ethiopia. It is the oldest news organisation in Ethiopia.

The ENA's inception dates back to 1942, when a news distribution service was opened as part of the Press Department, which was within the Press and Information Bureau. In 1943, the service became called Agence Direction, and was under the Ministry of Pen (Tsehafi Tae'zaz in Amharic). It can be argued that it was the first national wire service in Africa, as no other African country had an indigenous service of the kind, due to colonialism, wherein social, political and economic institutions were established by, and made to serve, the interests of the colonial powers. Agence Direction closed in 1947 due to budget constraints in the Ministry of Pen.

In 1954, Emperor Haile Selassie was embarking on a world tour and Agence Direction reopened so that Ethiopia could receive news of the tour. There was no further significant development in the next 10 years, except for a few attempts at expanding the service locally.

Beginning in late 1963, Agence Direction began to make its presence felt among the public through newspapers and radio broadcasting. Its name was changed to Ethiopian News Source in 1964, then to its present name of Ethiopian News Agency in 1967.

In 1995, it became a semi-autonomous agency under a board that is accountable to the House of Peoples' Representatives. Its autonomy is very limited, with the government having full control.

It has about three dozen branches across the country.

References

Citations

Works cited

External links

1942 establishments in Ethiopia
Mass media companies established in 1942
Mass media in Addis Ababa
Multilingual news services
News agencies based in Ethiopia
State media